The Welsh National War Memorial is situated in Alexandra Gardens, Cathays Park, Cardiff. The memorial was designed by Sir Ninian Comper and unveiled on 12 June 1928 by the Prince of Wales. The memorial commemorates the servicemen who died during the First World War and has a commemorative plaque for those who died during the Second World War, added in 1949.

Design and construction
The Memorial was first suggested in 1917. However, detailed proposals were not established until October 1919 when the Western Mail created a national subscription fund and a committee set up to manage the scheme. There were four designs submitted to the committee and the design selected was by Sir Ninian Comper and approved in 1924. It was sculptured by Henry Alfred Pegram. The stone masons were William Drinkwater Gough and Messrs E Turner & Sons. The bronze statues were cast by A.B. Burton. The memorial is the only 'secular' work by Comper, who was primarily a furnisher of churches. He received much hostility, from the president of the Royal Institute of British Architects and others, for not being a qualified architect, but was supported by the sculptors Sir William Goscombe John and Sir Hamo Thornycroft.

The memorial takes the form of a circular colonnade surrounding a sunken court. On the frieze above the columns are inscriptions in Welsh, on the outer side, and in English, on the inner side. The English inscription was composed by Comper himself. At the centre of the court is a group of three bronze sculptures arranged around a stone pylon. Around the base stand three figures, a soldier, sailor and airman, holding wreaths aloft. There are appropriate inscriptions above the figures e.g. 'Over the sea he went to die', above the sailor. Above them, crowning the structure, is a winged male nude representing Victory.

The memorial's form was inspired by two visits to French North Africa and particularly Tunisia, where the architect was inspired by the public works erected by the emperor Hadrian; it seems that historical and secular architecture and religious design in architecture coincided within the memorials erected in the West, in particular in the 1927 Lorimer War Memorial in Edinburgh where the use of a sword as an element with the Cross of Sacrifice in the cemeteries of the Imperial War Graves Commission is echoed within the central element of the Shrine (this memorial having been opened in 1927 by the Prince of Wales as the Scottish National War Memorial, and consequently presumably in some form associated with that of Wales and possibly others). In order for Pegram to find a model for the bronzes, the crews of two battleships were invited to the Union Jack Club in Waterloo, London. The sculptor selected a young sailor called Frederick William Baker, an Englishman from Brixton, in the nude and in uniform.

The memorial was unveiled on 12 June 1928 by Edward, Prince of Wales. The ceremony was broadcast by the nascent BBC.

The Memorial is Grade II* listed.

A number of other war memorials can also be found in Alexandra Gardens. These include one to Raoul Wallenberg who was a Swedish Ambassador in Hungary and saved 100,000 people by issuing them with Swedish passports enabling them to flee Nazi persecution. A recent addition is for the men of Cardiff who were killed in action during the Falklands War. A new memorial has also recently been built dedicated to the men from the International Brigade who fought in the Spanish Civil War.

See also
 South African War Memorial, Cardiff

Sources

 Anthony Symondson and Stephen Bucknall, Sir Ninian Comper (Reading: Spire Books, 2006)

References

External links
 Channel 4 Lost Generation Memorial Details
 

Landmarks in Cardiff
Cathays Park
Grade II* listed buildings in Cardiff
British military memorials and cemeteries
Colonnades
Grade II* listed monuments and memorials in Wales
War memorials in Cardiff
Neoclassical architecture in Wales
World War I memorials in Wales